"Ain't That a Kick in the Head?" is a pop song written in 1960 with music by Jimmy Van Heusen and lyrics by Sammy Cahn. It was first recorded that year on May 10 by Dean Martin in a swinging big band jazz arrangement conducted by Nelson Riddle. Martin performed the song in the 1960 heist film Ocean's 11 in an alternate arrangement featuring vibraphonist Red Norvo and his quartet.

The song was covered in 2004 by Irish boy band Westlife on their sixth studio album, ...Allow Us to Be Frank. Despite not charting in Ireland and failing to appear on the UK Singles Chart, their cover of the song reached No. 4 on the UK Download Chart, peaked at No. 5 in Denmark, and charted within the top 50 in Flanders, the Netherlands, and Sweden.

Background
Van Heusen and Cahn wrote the song specifically for the 1960 film Ocean's 11, though it was initially referred to press as "Ain't That a Kick in the Seat". Dean Martin's single was released before the film, which premiered
on August 10, 1960.

Reception
Despite being listed on the "Very Strong Sales Potential" list in Billboard'''s "Reviews of This Week's Singles", Dean Martin's initial release failed to chart. However, the song has become strongly associated with Martin and—despite never technically being a "hit" in terms of sales or radio play—has been released on many Dean Martin "greatest hits" albums, such as Dino: The Essential Dean Martin, Greatest Hits (Capitol), and Greatest Hits (EMI), as well as many swing and easy listening compilations. Contributing to this association is his performance of the song in Ocean's 11, which is considered the "quintessential" Rat Pack film.
The song also appears in the video games Fallout New Vegas and Mafia II, and in the film, Mission Impossible: Ghost Protocol''.

Westlife cover version

Charts

References

1960 singles
1960 songs
Capitol Records singles
Dean Martin songs
RCA Records singles
Song recordings produced by Steve Mac
Songs with lyrics by Sammy Cahn
Songs with music by Jimmy Van Heusen
Sony BMG singles
Westlife songs